Teluk Bahang is a town within the city of George Town in the Malaysian state of Penang. It is located within the Southwest Penang Island District, near the northwestern tip of Penang Island. Established as a fishing village, Teluk Bahang has evolved into a tourist destination, with a number of attractions built within the vicinity of the town.

Notably, it is also home to the Teluk Bahang Dam, the largest reservoir on Penang Island.

Teluk Bahang Forest Reserve is part of Penang Hill Biosphere Reserve, recognized by UNESCO as the third Biosphere Reserve in Malaysia listed in the World Network of Biosphere Reserve (WNBR).

Etymology 
Teluk Bahang literally means 'the bay of heat' in Malay. It was named as such due to the high temperature of the incoming sea breeze at the area.

History 
Teluk Bahang was founded as an agricultural village, where fishing provided subsistence for the village's residents. In the latter half of the 20th century, the town was developed into a tourist destination.

Teluk Bahang was one of the hardest-hit areas during the 2004 Indian Ocean tsunami. As a result, a network of tsunami warning systems has been set up throughout Penang, including in Teluk Bahang.

Demographics 
The town of Teluk Bahang straddles two mukims – Telok Bahang and Pantai Acheh. According to the 2010 National Census conducted by Malaysia's Department of Statistics, these mukims cumulatively contained a population of 7,494.

Another 4% of the population consisted of ethnic Indians.

Transportation 
Jalan Teluk Bahang is the main thoroughfare within the town and forms part of the pan-island Federal Route 6. The road links Teluk Bahang with Balik Pulau to the south and Batu Ferringhi to the east.

Rapid Penang bus routes 101, 102 and 501 include stops within Teluk Bahang, connecting the town with various destinations, such as Penang's capital city of George Town, the Penang International Airport, Sungai Nibong and Balik Pulau.

The Hop-On Hop-Off bus service, which utilises open-topped double-decker buses, caters mainly for tourists. It includes four stops within Teluk Bahang – the Tropical Spice Garden, Penang National Park, Entopia Butterfly Farm and the Teluk Bahang Forest Eco Park.

Education 
Teluk Bahang is served by two primary schools and a single high school.

Primary schools
 SRK Telok Bahang
 SRJK (C) Eok Hua
High school
 SMK Teluk Bahang

Tourist attractions
Teluk Bahang is home to several tourist attractions, which include forest reserves, ecotourism sites and theme parks.
 Penang National Park

The Penang National Park, gazetted in 2003, spans  of the northwestern tip of Penang Island and is the smallest national park in the world. It encompasses mangrove swamps and rainforest interspersed with hiking trails, as well as beaches such as Monkey Beach and Kerachut Beach. One of the hiking trails leads to the Muka Head Lighthouse, which is situated at the northwestern tip of the island. The forest reserve is home to over 600 species of flora and fauna. 
 Tropical Spice Garden

The Tropical Spice Garden was also opened in 2003 and is an  secondary forest consisting of 500 species of floras and faunas. Local varieties of spices can be found within the garden, which includes a culinary school dedicated to the famed local cuisine. This spice repository was also featured in the reality television show The Amazing Race 16.
 Tropical Fruit Farm
The  Tropical Fruit Farm, opened in 1993, contains about 250 types of locally-grown fruits.
 Entopia Butterfly Farm
Established in 1986 as the Penang Butterfly Farm, it was the first butterfly sanctuary in Malaysia. Following an upgrade in 2016, it was renamed as the Entopia Butterfly Farm. This butterfly sanctuary is home to about 13,000 butterflies from 120 different species, including the rare Indian Leafl (Kallima paralekta), the endangered Yellow Bird wing (Troides helena) and Rajah Brooke's Bird wing, as well as small reptiles.
 Teluk Bahang Forest Eco Park

The Teluk Bahang Forest Eco Park, established in 1974, is a recreational area equipped with picnic and camping grounds, and encompasses a handful of waterfalls and a forestry museum.
 ESCAPE Adventure Play
Opened on 8 November 2012, the ESCAPE Adventure Play is an eco-themed amusement park, where visitors can engage in challenging activities and games which include climbing and rope courses.
 ESCAPE Water Play
Launched in 2017 as the aquatic version of the ESCAPE Adventure Play, the ESCAPE Water Play consists of a variety of aquatic attractions and swimming pools, including the world's longest water slide.

Infrastructure 
Completed in 1999, the Teluk Bahang Dam, the largest reservoir on Penang Island, is capable of storing 19.24 billion litres of water. It also holds the distinction of being the only dam in Malaysia to be built within a few kilometres from the sea. In addition, the dam functions as a sports venue, as the yearly Penang International Dragon Boat Festival is held within the dam. The dragon boat race, held every December, attracts dozens of local and international teams, such as from Singapore, Hong Kong, China and Thailand.

References 

Southwest Penang Island District
Towns in Penang